Richard Aylmer (d. 3rd day before the Ides of September 1512, i.e. 11 September 1512) of Norwich, Norfolk, was an English politician.

He was a grocer, Sheriff of Norwich in 1501 and Mayor of Norwich in 1511. He was married twice, first to Joan, and had by her two sons and two daughters, and secondly to Ellen/Elaine/Helen, and had by her four daughters.

He was the son of Robert Aylmer, grocer, Sheriff of Norwich in 1471, Alderman of Norwich in 1480, and Mayor of Norwich in 1481 and 1492, and Elizabeth.

References 

1512 deaths
Mayors of Norwich
Politicians from Norwich